Homalopoma sangarense is a species of sea snail, a marine gastropod mollusk in the family Colloniidae.

Description
The height of the shell varies between 7 mm and 10 mm. The median teeth of the radula are oval, wide, with a narrow projection above, and more or less narrowed toward the base. The upper margin is in no case reflected, so that cusp, cutting point or edge, in any usual sense, there is none.

Distribution
This marine species occurs off Vietnam, Korea, North Japan and Sakhalin

References

External links
 

Colloniidae
Gastropods described in 1862